Sabrina the Teenage Witch (titled Sabrina and the Groovie Goolies or The Sabrina Comedy Hour and promotionally referred to as The Sabrina the Teenage Witch Show or The Sabrina Comedy Show) is an American animated television series produced by Filmation that aired on CBS during Saturday mornings from 1970 to 1974. The series has also aired in prime time as a syndicated series.

Based on Archie Comics' Sabrina the Teenage Witch, the show was a spin-off of The Archie Comedy Hour, featuring new episodes of Sabrina along with the Groovie Goolies. Writers at Archie Comics later stated they were "flabbergasted" that Filmation sought to cast Sabrina, then a minor (but rising) character in the Archie Comics fictional universe, as the lead role in an animated series.

The show's opening strapline is:
"Once upon a time, there were three witches, who lived in the little town of Riverdale. Two aunts, Hilda and Zelda, are choosing the ingredients to create an evil wicked witch. But suddenly, Zelda bumped right into Hilda and accidentally added beautiful girls' stuff as an extra ingredient. Thus, the grooviest teenage witch was born. She has white hair with a pink headband, and blue eyes. She wears a blue dress with a black belt and black shoes. She loves to goof off and battle evil forces using her ultra magical powers. It so happens that she is the first bewitching American superhero — Sabrina, the teenage witch!"

The series follows a teenaged witch who likes to hang out with her friends at Riverdale High and fight enemies using her magical powers without letting her friends discover her secret. This series was aimed primarily towards young girls ages 6 to 14 and contained an adult laugh track. Following its first season, the series was reduced to a half-hour when the Goolies were spun off into their own series.

Filmation animated Sabrina once more in 1977 with The New Archie and Sabrina Hour.

Voices
Jane Webb - Sabrina Spellman, Aunt Hilda, Aunt Zelda, Miss Della the Head Witch, Betty Cooper, Veronica Lodge, Miss Grundy, Big Ethel, Bella La Ghostly, additional voices
Dallas McKennon - Salem, Archie Andrews, Hot Dog, Mr. Weatherbee, Pop Tate, Mr. Lodge, Coach Kleats, Ronnie, Clyde, Rover, Goo, additional voices
Don Messick - Harvey Kinkle, Spencer, Chili Dog, additional voices
Treva Frazee - Ophelia
John Erwin - Cousin Ambrose (1969-1970), Hexter, Reggie Mantle, additional voices
Howard Morris - Cousin Ambrose (1970-1971), Big Moose Mason, Jughead Jones, Hot Dog Jr., Frankie, Wolfie, Fido, Dr. Jekyll and Hyde, Mummy, Hauntleroy, Orville, additional voices
Larry D. Mann - Boneapart, additional voices
Larry Storch - Drac, Hagatha, Ghoulihand, Batso, Ratso, Icky, additional voices

Episodes

The Archie Comedy Hour (1969–1970)

Sabrina and the Groovie Goolies (1970–1971)

Home video

Genius Products released the complete series on DVD on April 29, 2008 in Region 1 as Sabrina the Teenage Witch: The Complete Animated Series.

Universal Pictures released a DVD titled Magical Antics, containing 10 episodes.

In 2017, Universal re-released the complete series DVD set.

References

External links
 
 

1970 American television series debuts
1974 American television series endings
1970s American animated television series
American animated television spin-offs
American children's animated comedy television series
American children's animated fantasy television series
American children's animated supernatural television series
American superhero comedy television series
CBS original programming
Crossover animated television series
English-language television shows
First-run syndicated television programs in the United States
Sabrina the Teenage Witch
Slapstick comedy
Teen animated television series
Television shows based on Archie Comics
Television series by Filmation
Television series by Universal Television
Television series set in the 1960s
Television series about witchcraft
Television shows directed by Hal Sutherland